Assandh is a city and a municipal committee in Karnal district in the state of Haryana, India. Assandh is 45 km south-west of Karnal.

History

Early history
Archaeological excavations have revealed Painted Grey Ware, associated with the Vedic people of Iron Age India. Assandh is identified with ancient Āsandīvat, a capital of the Kuru Kingdom, which was the first recorded state in Ancient India, c. 1200 BCE. Historian Charles Allen has related this town and the Stupa to the Asandhiwat Kingdom from which hailed Asandhimitra, the Chief Queen (Agramahisi) of the Mauryan emperor Ashoka.

Assandh Stupa 

The ruins of more-than-2000-year-old Buddhist stupa is situated at Assandh. The stupa is 25-metre high and at least 75 metres in diameter raised on an earthen platform. It is built with the help of bricks. This stupa is bigger than the much-famous stupa at Sanchi. According to historians, bricks used to construct this stupa, having a width of more than two-feet, indicate that the history of this monument dates back to more than 2000 years.

The ruins of this structure is also known as Jarasandh ka Qila/Teela or Jarasandh ka Teela (Fort/Mound of Jarasandh) named after a character of epic Mahabharat, and forms part of the 48 kos parikrama of Kurukshetra.

According to Archaeological Survey of India, this is a Kushan stupa (belongs to Kushan period).

Colonial era 
Assandh had a large Muslims population before 1947. After the 1947, Muslims were replace with the Sikhs and Punjabi Khatri refugee migrants from Pakistani Punjab.

Modern history 
Panipat was the part of District Karnal till 31 October 1989, which was upgraded as a separate District, including Assandh Tehsil of district Karnal. When the District was reformed on 1 January 1992 Assandh Tehsil was excluded from this District.

There is a Gurudwara, many Hindu Temples,  a Sanatan Dharm Mandir and a Masjid also.

Demographics
As of 2011 Indian Census, Assandh had a total population of 27,125, of which 14,385 were males and 12,740 were females. Population within the age group of 0 to 6 years was 3,404. The total number of literates in Assandh was 18,192, which constituted 67.1% of the population with male literacy of 70.9% and female literacy of 62.7%. The effective literacy rate of 7+ population of Assandh was 76.7%, of which male literacy rate was 81.9% and female literacy rate was 70.9%. The Scheduled Castes population was 6,183. Assandh had 5081 households in 2011.

 India census, Assandh had a population of 22,707. Males constitute 53% of the population and females 47%. Assandh has an average literacy rate of 62%, higher than the national average of 59.5%; with 58% of the males and 42% of females literate. 15% of the population was in the 0 to 6 years age group.

Politics
Assandh is part of Assandh constituency of the Haryana Vidhan Sabha. The following is the list of MLAs have been elected from this constituency:
 1952 – Kasturi Lal – INC
 1977 – Jogi Ram – JNP
 1982 – Manphool Singh – LKD
 1987 – Manphool Singh – LKD
 1991 – Krishan Lal Panwar – JP
 1996 – Krishan Lal Panwar – SAP
 2000 – Krishan Lal Panwar – INLD
 2005 – Raj Rani Poonam – INC
 2009 – Pt. Zile Ram Sharma – INC
 2014 – Sardar Bakhshish Singh Virk – BJP
 2019 – Shamsher Singh Gogi – INC

Notable villages in Assandh Tehsil 
Gangatheri
Jabhala
Kheri Naru
Uplana
Rahara
Rangrutti Khera
Salwan
Agond

References

Cities and towns in Karnal district
Buddhist pilgrimage sites in India
Stupas in India